Woolly hair autosomal recessive is a rare hereditary hair disorder characterized by sparse, short, curly hair.

Signs/symptoms

The scalp hair is sparse, short and curly. It grows slowly and stops growing after a few inches.

Genetics

This condition may be part of a more complex syndrome or an isolated mutation.

Isolated cases are due to mutations in the lipase member H (LIPH), lysophosphatidic acid receptor 6 (LPAR6) or keratin 2A (KRT2) genes. Isolated cases are inherited in an autosomal recessive fashion.

Epidemiology

This is rare disorder. Precise estimates of its prevalence are not known.

Diagnosis

This is made by light microscopy. A number of structural anomalies are visible under light microscopy including trichorrhexis nodosa and tapered ends.

Differential diagnosis

 Cardiofaciocutaneous syndrome
 Naxos disease
 Palmoplantar keratoderma and cardiomyopathy syndrome

Treatment

There is no treatment for this condition known at present.

Prognosis

In isolate cases life expectancy is normal and there are no other related problems.

As part of another syndrome this will depend on the other features of the syndrome.

References

External links 

Hair diseases